The Jaysh al-Muwahhideen or Jaysh Abu Ibrahim is a Druze militia group in Syria. Their name means "Army of Monotheists" or "Army of Unitarians". The group mainly operates in the Suwayda, Deraa, Damascus and other regions where the Druze are concentrated and announced their formation in the beginning of 2013. The leadership describes the group as Unitarian Druze engaging in defensive war, but has also been described as supporters of Bashar al-Assad and his government. It operates largely in Jabal al-Arab or Mountain of the Arabs, also known as Jabal ad-Druze, a mountainous area of Suwayda governorate as well as the Jabal al-Sheikh area in Damascus governorate, areas primarily inhabited by Druze. The group was set up in response to attacks on Druze civilians. The group commemorates anti-colonial figures such as Sultan al-Atrash, who was a prominent Druze chieftain.

See also
 Belligerents in the Syrian Civil War
 Druze people in Syria
 Jabal Druze State
 Druze
 Sword Battalion
 Golan Regiment
 Sultan Pasha al-Atrash Battalion

References

2013 establishments in Syria
Military units and formations established in 2013
Pro-government factions of the Syrian civil war
Druze militant groups
Druze in Syria